Summer is a novel by Edith Wharton, which was published in 1917 by Charles Scribner's Sons.  While most novels by Edith Wharton dealt with New York's upper-class society, this is one of two novels by Wharton that were set in New England.  Its themes include social class, the role of women in society, destructive relationships, sexual awakening and the desire of its protagonist, named Charity Royall. The novel was rather controversial for its time and is one of the less famous among her novels because of its subject matter.

Plot summary 
At the start of the novel, young Charity Royall is bored with her life in the small town of North Dormer. She was born to poor parents from "up the Mountain" who gave her up to the town's learned person, Lawyer Royall, but she still dreams of an even better and more exciting life outside of the town. She secures a job at North Dormer's library in an attempt to save up money so she can eventually leave the town and Mr. Royall's care. The widowed Mr. Royall makes an inappropriate advance toward Charity one night that she rebuffs but it irrevocably sours their relationship

When she is 17, that exciting life finds her in the form of a visiting architect named Lucius Harney. Her first encounter with the charming young man is at the library and there is immediate chemistry between them.  Soon, he finds himself boarding at Mr. Royall's house when his own living arrangements fall through.

Charity Royall finds herself attracted to Lucius and decides to become his companion as he explores the town.  He is putting together a book on colonial houses and the two of them go around town together so he can inspect and sketch the houses as a part of his research for the book. Mr. Royall, who holds onto the idea of marrying Charity, notices the two of them growing close and immediately evicts Lucius from his house. Lucius leaves town and relocates to a nearby village.

Later on, Charity and Lucius visit Nettleton for the Fourth of July, where they kiss for the first time and Lucius gives Charity a brooch. Before they are finished with their outing, they run into Mr. Royall, who seems really drunk. Mr. Royall verbally attacks Charity, which causes her to feel intense shame and hence falls into Lucius's arms. After the day's events, Charity and Lucius grow even closer and have sex for the first time.

After this, the two lovers meet frequently at an abandoned house. Charity develops fear when she sees Lucius with Annabel Balch, a local society girl, at a social event. Lucius promises to meet Charity at their usual place but when she goes there, she meets Mr. Royall who confronts her. Lucius promises to marry Charity but excuses himself to move out of town for a while. Later, a person comes to tell Charity that Lucius went out of town with Annabel Balch, a local society girl. Charity writes a letter to Lucius in bitterness telling him to marry Annabel.

Immediately after these events, Charity begins feeling sick. A doctor confirms that she is pregnant. Charity does not have any money to pay for the check-up and therefore, she gives the doctor the brooch Lucius gave her as collateral. Upon reaching home, she receives a letter from Lucius that confirms that he is going to marry Annabel and that he is pleased she has given him her blessing to do so. This frustrates her until she decides to pack and go look for her long-lost mother in the mountains.  However, it turns out to be too late because Charity's mother passes away before they can reunite.

While staying at the Mountain with her relatives, Charity observes the poverty that has stricken people living around the Mountain. From the experience she has in the Mountain, she vows she will do everything to ensure that her child does not grow in poverty. She therefore returns home, intending to become a prostitute to support her child. However, along the way, she meets again with Mr. Royall. Mr. Royall offers her a ride and they decide to marry.  In the end, she writes a letter to Lucius telling him about her marriage and finally returns home to stay with her husband in North Dormer.

Major characters 
 Charity Royall: She is the major character in the story. A stranger seduces, impregnates and abandons her. In other terms, according to this scenario, dependence can mean security and she therefore ends up marrying for her former guardian.
 Lawyer Royall: The lawyer's feelings towards Charity have been paternal all along until the death of his wife.  After this, his heavy drinking helps to tear down the wall securing his growing lust and desire for sexual satisfaction. He keeps his distance away from Charity, hires workers to be in the house and assists her to achieve her desire for independence; however, he is very much pained by these experiences. When Charity's lover abandons her while she is pregnant, her guardian comes in to rescue the situation by marrying her.
 Lucius Harney: Lucius is a young New York architect who enters the life of Charity and entices with the promise of being everything to her life. On the other hand, Charity strongly feels attracted to Lucius and envious of him too. Lucius is hence more than just her summer lover. He is also the symbol of everything that Charity ever imagines for herself.
 Anabel Balch: Annabel on the other hand is not a symbol of everything that Charity Royall does not have; she is the literal reverse of it. Annabel has been described as a blonde lady, blue-eyed, fashionable, educated, and wealthy. She eventually becomes Mr. Lucius Harney's wife.
 Julia Hawes: The character Julia is described as the oldest sister of Charity's best friend Ally. Julia also happened to have been a victim of a love affair, that later left her pregnant and abandoned. However, Julia's case is slightly different since after aborting, she gets into prostitution and has ever since become the persona in the small town. Julia is the cautionary tale which later interferes with Charity's decision making.

References

Further reading
 Baldwin, Neil, et al. "Criticism and bibliography." The Cambridge Companion to William Carlos Williams 35 (2016): 207.
 Wharton, Edith. Fighting France: From Dunkerque to Belfort. Edinburgh University Press, 2015.
 Wharton, Edith. Summer. Oxford University Press, USA, 2015.

External links

 
 
 
 
 

1917 American novels
Novels by Edith Wharton